Playphone is a social gaming network founded in 2003 that allows users to interact with their friends over mobile games.

History
Founded in April 2003 by Ron Czerny, Playphone is funded by Menlo Ventures, Cardinal Venture Capital, and Coral Capital Management. Playphone provides direct-to-consumer mobile content distribution.  Selling through 4,000 retail stores, including Best Buy, EB Games, Fred Meyers, Rite Aid, and Target, consumers purchase pre-paid phone cards offering two mobile games, two polyphonic ringtones, and two wallpaper options. Early partners included Digital Bridges, offering access to game titles including Lara Croft Tomb Raider, and Disney's The Lion King.

Expanding its offer portfolio, Playphone went on to build a subscription-based service to provide games, ringtones, and wallpaper for mobile phones, with a library of more than 150 games and thousands of ringtones.

In September 2006, Playphone raised $9.1 million dollars in Series B funding from Menlo Ventures and Cardinal Venture Capital. In May 2007, Playphone secured its Series C funding of $18.75 million dollars from Scale Venture Capital, which was used to facilitate Playphone’s expansion into Latin America.

In May 2008, Playphone acquired Pitch Entertainment Group, a London-based mobile content distributor founded by David Warburton. The acquisition of Pitch enabled Playphone to continue its global expansion and granted them access to additional users in 20 countries across Africa, Asia and Europe. In June 2008, Playphone partnered with UK based Top Up TV to showcase its mobile content in a new Playphone branded TV channel.  Also in June 2008, Playphone partnered with Cellufun to provide Playphone’s mobile content to their 5.5+ million users and signed new distribution agreements with Virgin Mobile USA and Cincinnati Bell.

Playphone continued its growth in 2009 and in October, Playphone partnered with Vantrix to deploy its Vantrix Storefront Optimizer to support Playphone’s continued expansion into the Asian mobile market.

In October 2010, Playphone announced its new mobile social gaming platform for smartphones and tablets called Playphone Social. Playphone Social was a strategic shift for Playphone’s mobile entertainment content offerings and helped Playphone make the leap from feature phones to smartphones. Playphone’s new platform would focus on its revolutionary mobile social gaming technology and feature multiplayer cross-platform mobile social gaming.

In December 2010, Playphone launched Playphone Poker for iOS; its first smartphone game in support of its mobile gaming network. Playphone Poker is a freemium casino-style Texas Hold’em game that achieved a top 5 casino apps ranking and over 2 million downloads in the App Store for the first 4 months after its launch.

In February 2011, Playphone introduced the beta version of the Playphone Social Gaming Network. Later, in June 2011, they launched the Android version of their popular game, Playphone Poker [18]. In August 2011, Playphone declared a global strategic agreement with Perfect World, a Chinese-based mobile gaming company. This partnership aimed to distribute various games on the Playphone Social Network [19].

Then, in December 2011, Playphone commercially launched their new gaming network, which provided a social, cross-platform mobile gaming experience. With this, iOS, Android, and WP7 mobile gamers could play together [20].

In March 2012, Playphone acquired SocialHour, a mobile social marketing firm, to strengthen their mobile marketing and distribution expertise. This was in support of the growth and development of the Playphone Social Gaming Network [21].

Playphone Social Gaming Network

Launched in December 2011, Playphone Social Gaming Network (PSGN) is an advanced cross-platform, multiplayer network that connects smartphone and tablet gamers to a worldwide social gaming experience. Playphone’s cross-platform technology works on the world’s leading platforms including iOS, Android, HTML5, WP, Windows Phone 7 and supports Adobe AIR. Due to this, Playphone is able to connect gamers with the most popular games that give them the ability to play with their friends at any time regardless of their operating system.

One major feature is the InstaMultiplay function which can be easily integrated by developers. 
InstaMultiplay features include:
Play Now: automatically connects players with live opponents or computer-managed robots
Play with Friends: allows players to instantly challenge online friends and invite friends to play via Facebook or email
Go to Lobby: lobby environment where players can challenge or be challenged to a game regardless if players are connected or not

By June 2012, Playphone’s Social Gaming Network had 4.1 million monthly active users, 12 million game sessions, 3.5 million play hours, and over 3,000 developers. One of the most successful titles to date, Assaulter Special Operations, broke into the top 20 on the Google Play store on Android devices.

Playphone’s first carrier app store – Games Portal on Verizon - launched in 2013.   Preloaded on multiple Android devices.  Users can see what games their friends are playing, download and play their friends’ favorite games with them, and invite other friends to play, all from the same app.

Developer access

PSGN was designed as a developer-friendly platform, giving developers full control over the publishing and distribution of their game, IP, customer experience, and virtual economies. The SDK provides a suite of social and engagement tools to optimize monetization, engagement, distribution and user experience while providing direct access to one-click carrier billing, soon-to-launch carrier app stores and hundreds of millions of carrier subscribers.

References

Companies established in 2003
Companies based in San Jose, California
Mobile phone companies of the United States
Video game companies based in California
Mobile software
Cross-platform mobile software
Mobile game companies